Hymer or Hymers is a surname, and may refer to:

Jennifer Hymer (born 1960s), American pianist living in Hamburg, Germany
John Hymers (1803–1887), English mathematician and cleric
R. L. Hymers, Jr. (born 1941), American Baptist pastor and author
Stephen Hymer (1934–1974), Canadian economist
Warren Hymer (1906–1948), American film actor

See also
Hymer, German motorhome manufacturer